Turnovo (Torna) is a rural locality (a village) in Urgushevsky Selsoviet, Karaidelsky District, Bashkortostan, Russia. The population was 77 as of 2010. There are 6 streets.

Geography 
Turnovo is located 40 km southwest of Karaidel (the district's administrative centre) by road. Nikolo-Kazanka and Suleymanovo are the nearest rural localities.

References 

Rural localities in Karaidelsky District